Aşağı İmamqulukənd is the Lezgin village and municipality in the Qusar Rayon of Azerbaijan. It has a population of 770.  The municipality consists of the villages of Aşağı İmamqulukənd and Mucuqoba.

References

Populated places in Qusar District